Cathay General Bancorp (NASDAQ: CATY) is the holding company for Cathay Bank, a California state-chartered commercial bank.  Founded in 1962, Cathay Bank offers a wide range of a wide range of financial services.  The bank has branch offices in Southern California (22 branches), Northern California (12 branches), New York (12 branches), Illinois (three branches), Washington (three branches), Texas (two branches), Maryland (one branch), Massachusetts (one branch), Nevada (one branch), New Jersey (one branch), and Hong Kong (one branch) and a representative office in Shanghai and in Taipei.

History
Cathay General Bancorp is the holding company for Cathay Bank, a California state-chartered bank.  In 1962, Cathay Bank opened for business providing financial services to the Chinese-American community in the greater Los Angeles area, thus becoming the first Chinese-American bank in Southern California.  Its rapid expansion was fueled by successive waves of immigration, burgeoning trade between America and Asia, and the economic development of the surrounding community.

Today, Cathay Bank is a subsidiary of Cathay General Bancorp, a publicly held bank holding company with over $14.5 billion in assets as of December 31, 2016. Its service network extends from California and Washington on the West Coast and Nevada, Texas, and Illinois, and New York, New Jersey, Maryland, and Massachusetts on the Eastern Seaboard. Overseas, it has a presence in the three important commercial centers in Greater China—Hong Kong, Shanghai, and Taipei.

Banks based in California